Vinohrady nad Váhom is a village and municipality in Galanta District of  the Trnava Region of south-west Slovakia.

History
In historical records the village was first mentioned in 1958.

Geography
The municipality lies at an elevation of 170 metres and covers an area of 10.696 km². It has a population of about 1,515 people.

External links
  Official page
 http://www.statistics.sk/mosmis/eng/run.html

Villages and municipalities in Galanta District